Karimedu Karuvayan is a 1986 Indian Tamil-language vigilante action film directed by Rama Narayanan and written by Gokula Krishnan. The film stars Vijayakanth, Nalini, Pandiyan and Aruna. It was released on 14 January 1986, and became a success.

Plot 
The story about Karuvayan who takes revenge on five people who killed his sister. He kills four as per his plan but gets caught by police and is punished by court with death penalty. Shortly before his execution he escapes from prison and kills the last person. While fleeing from the village he is shot by police and dies. His love interest kaliammal also dies due to shock.

Cast

Production 
After the success of Malaiyoor Mambattiyan (1983), Tamil cinema started making numerous films based on outlaws, with Karimedu Karuvayan being one such.

Soundtrack 
The music was composed by Ilaiyaraaja.

Reception 
Jeyamanmadhan of Kalki said everyone in the film did well.

References

External links 
 

1980 films
1980s Tamil-language films
1980s vigilante films
1985 action films
1985 films
Films directed by Rama Narayanan
Films scored by Ilaiyaraaja
Indian action films
Indian vigilante films